The Rolls-Royce RB.41 Nene is a 1940s British centrifugal compressor turbojet engine. First run in 1944, it was Rolls-Royce's third jet engine to enter production, and first ran less than 6 months from the start of design. It was named after the River Nene in keeping with the company's tradition of naming its jet engines after rivers.

The design saw relatively little use in British aircraft designs, being passed over in favour of the axial-flow Avon that followed it. Its only widespread use in the UK was in the Hawker Sea Hawk and the Supermarine Attacker. In the US it was built under licence as the Pratt & Whitney J42, and it powered the Grumman F9F Panther.

A higher thrust version of the Nene was produced as the Rolls-Royce Tay.

Design and development

The Nene was designed as a result of a June 1944 visit to the US by Hooker. He was surprized to learn that General Electric already had two engine types running, an axial and a centrifugal, of  thrust. He was determined to produce a higher thrust engine and subsequently obtained a Ministry of Aircraft Production contract for an engine of 4,200 lbf (19 kN) thrust with the understanding that  would be the design target. Hooker, Lombard, Pearson and Morley designed a new engine, the B.41 later called the Nene, rather than scaling up the Derwent. 

A scaled up Derwent of the same thrust would have had a  diameter. The compressor casing was based on Whittle's Type 16 W.2/500 compressor case which was more aerodynamically efficient than that on the Derwent but also eliminated cracking. Other design advances included nine new low pressure-drop/high efficiency combustion chambers developed by Lucas and a small impeller for rear bearing and turbine disc cooling. The first engine start was attempted on 27 October 1944. A number of snags delayed the run until nearly midnight, when with almost the entire day and night shift staff watching, an attempt was made to start the engine. To the frustration of everyone with a vested interest in it starting the engine refused to light - positioning the igniter was a trial-and-error affair at the time. On a subsequent attempt, Denis Drew, who had come from Lucas, the combustion specialists, and took a wide interest in engine development problems, removed one of the igniters and instead used the flame from an oxy-acetylene torch to ignite the fuel in the combustion chamber.

The igniter had to be close enough to the fuel spray to ignite it when starting, but not overheat when subjected to the continuous flame temperature when the engine was running. The larger diameter of the Nene combustion chambers found this to be a problem,  and the first-run needed to ignite with a flame rather than the spark energy that was considered sufficient at that time. The Nene was subsequently fitted with two torch, or flame, igniters which had a fuel spray next to an igniter. The flame would project into the main combuster fuel spray. Torch igniters were superseded by surface discharge igniter plugs with a considerably greater energy release rate than a flame.

However the engine was running hotter than expected and would not reach 5,000 lb, as it was built, without overheating the turbine. Pearson, the performance engineer, insisted that no more running be done without fitting the inlet swirl vanes that were available. Upon Hooker's arrival next morning, and informed that the inlet vanes had been fitted during the night, Hooker was overjoyed to see the thrust gauge needle registering  at the same temperature that had only given 4,000 lb the previous night, making the B.41 the highest thrust jet engine in the world.

Inlet swirl vanes had been in use in Whittle engines for some time. They improve the overall performance of the engine significantly by enabling a higher airflow into the impeller without exceeding the maximum allowable Mach number at the tip of the impeller eye. However they were made from thin sheet metal and often broke damaging the engine. For Hooker they were a worrying mechanical problem which he did not want so they were not fitted when the Derwent entered service, although the turbine had to run 90 degC hotter to give the take-off thrust of 2,000 lb. He was still concerned with the durability of the vanes so the first Nene was initially built without them.

The Nene was based on the "straight-through" version of the basic Whittle-style layout, with the flow going directly through the engine from front to rear, as opposed to a "reverse-flow" type, which reverses the direction of air flow through the combustor section so that the turbine stage can be mounted within the combustor section; this allows for a more compact engine, but increases the combustor pressure losses which has an adverse effect on engine performance. Less thrust is generated with the same fuel flow. It was during the design of the Nene that Rolls decided to give their engines numbers as well as names, with the Welland and Derwent keeping their original Rover models, B/23 and B/26. It was later decided that these model designations looked too much like RAF bomber designations (i.e. "English Electric Canberra B.Mk 2" would often be shortened to "Canberra B.2"), and "R" was added to the front, the "R" signifying "Rolls" and the original Rover "B" signifying Barnoldswick. This RB designation scheme continued into the late 20th Century, with turbofan designs such as the RB.199, RB.203 and RB.211; the most recent family of Rolls-Royce turbofans (a development of the RB.211) goes under the simple designation "Rolls-Royce Trent", with variants given their own designator number or letter series (i.e. Trent 500, Trent 900, Trent 1000, Trent XWB, etc.).

Early airborne tests of the Nene were undertaken in an Avro Lancastrian operated by Rolls-Royce from their Hucknall airfield. The two outboard Rolls-Royce Merlins were replaced by the jet engine. The Nene's first flight however was in a modified Lockheed XP-80 Shooting Star.

After seeing the Nene running, at an after work drink at the Swan & Royal Hotel, Clitheroe, and hearing the complaints about a lack of any official application for the engine, someone - thought to be Whittle - suggested that the Nene be scaled-down to fit a Meteor nacelle. On hearing this, Hooker did a quick calculation and announced, "We've got a 600-mph [] Meteor".

By 1946 thrust had been increased to  using Nimonic 90 turbine blades.

The development of the Nene was continued with this scaled-down version, the Derwent V having no direct relationship to the earlier Derwent series. On 7 November 1945, the first official air speed record by a jet aircraft was set by a Meteor F.3 of 606 miles per hour (975 km/h) powered by the scaled-down Nene.

Service use
The Nene doubled the thrust of the earlier generation engines, with early versions providing about 5,000 lbf (22.2 kN), but remained generally similar in most ways. This should have suggested that it would be widely used in various designs, but the Gloster Meteor proved so successful with its Derwents that the Air Ministry felt there was no pressing need to improve upon it. Instead a series of much more capable designs using the Rolls-Royce Avon were studied, and the Nene generally languished.

A total of twenty-five Nenes were sold to the Soviet Union as a gesture of goodwill - with reservation to not use for military purposes - with the agreement of Stafford Cripps. Rolls-Royce were given permission in September 1946 to sell 10 Nene engines to the USSR, and in March 1947 to sell a further 15. The price was fixed under a commercial contract. A total of 55 jet engines were sold to the Soviets in 1947. The Soviets reneged on the deal after the Cold War broke out in 1947, and reverse engineered the Nene to develop the Klimov RD-45, and a larger version, the Klimov VK-1, which soon appeared in various Soviet fighters including Mikoyan-Gurevich MiG-15.

Pratt & Whitney acquired a licence to produce the Nene as the Pratt & Whitney J42, and it powered the Grumman F9F Panther which first flew in November 1947.

The Nene was used to power the first civil jet aircraft, the Nene Viking, a modified Vickers Viking, the single example of which first flew on 6 April 1948 from Wisley Airfield.

It was briefly made under licence in Australia for use in the RAAF de Havilland Vampire fighters. It was also built by Orenda in Canada for use in 656 Canadair CT-133 Silver Star aircraft from 1952.

Hispano-Suiza in France built the Nene under licence as the Hispano-Suiza Nene, with limited production before concentrating on the larger Rolls-Royce Tay/Hispano-Suiza Verdon.

Variants
RN.1
RN.2
RN.6
Nene I
Nene Mk.3With an electric starter motor and two torch igniters the Mk.3 powered the Supermarine Attacker F Mk.1.
Nene Mk.10Similar to the Mk.102 but with a larger accessories wheelcase for the Lockheed T-33.
Nene Mk.101With a bifurcated jet-pipe for the Hawker Sea Hawk, at a reduced output of 
Nene Mk.102Similar to the Mk.3, but incorporating more modern equipment, for the Supermarine Attacker FB Mk.2
Some were retrofitted to convert existing FB.3 and FGA.4 aircraft.
Pratt & Whitney J42 US licence production
J42-P-4
J42-P-6
J42-P-8
Turbo-Wasp JT-6B
Kuznetsov RD-45Unlicensed copy produced in the USSR
H.S. Nene 102
H.S. Nene 104
H.S. Nene 104-BR
H.S. Nene 105A
H.S. Nene 105-AR

Applications
Nene

Pratt & Whitney J42
 Grumman F9F Panther

 Kuznetsov RD-45
 Mikoyan-Gurevich MiG-15

Engines on display

 A complete Nene engine is displayed at the RAF Manston History Museum, Manston, Kent.
 A complete Nene engine is displayed at the South Yorkshire Aircraft Museum, Doncaster, England.
 A sectioned Rolls-Royce Nene is on display at the Fleet Air Arm Museum, RNAS Yeovilton.
 Gatwick Aviation Museum  Charlwood surrey
 A cutaway Nene II on display at the New England Air Museum
 A sectioned Hispano-Suiza Nene is on display at the Ailes Anciennes Toulouse Museum in France.
Ailes Anciennes Toulouse Museum Toulouse/Blagnac.
A sectioned RR Nene is on display at the Queensland Air Museum, Caloundra, Australia.
A complete Nene engine is on display at the Historical Aircraft Restoration Society, at Albion Park, New South Wales, Australia
A Nene, from a Pulqui II, is on display at the National Aeronautics Museum, Moron, Buenos Aires, Argentina.
A Nene is on display at the Rolls-Royce Heritage Trust Collection (Derby).

Specifications (Nene)

See also

References

Bibliography
 Bridgman, L, (ed.) (1998) Jane's fighting aircraft of World War II. Crescent.

External links

 Pratt & Whitney History page on the J42
 The Nanton Lancaster Society
 "Rolls-Royce Nene I" a 1946 Flight article on the Nene

Nene
1940s turbojet engines
Centrifugal-flow turbojet engines